Bantva (Gidad) is a former princely state on Saurashtra, Gujarat, India.

History
The Fifth Class princely state in Sorath prant, comprising thirty-three villages, covered 132 square miles and was ruled by Muslim Chieftains of the Babi family, like neighboring Bantva-Manavadar.

In 1901 it has a combined population of 24,374, yielding a state revenue of 228,175 Rupees (1903-4, mostly from land), paying 14,820 Rupees tribute, to the British.

See also
 Bantva Manavadar, neighbouring princely state ruled by the same family

References

External links
 Imperial Gazetteer on dsal.uchicago.edu - Kathiawar

Princely states of Gujarat
Muslim princely states of India